Lineberger is a surname. Notable people with the surname include:
 Walter F. Lineberger (1883–1943), American politician
 William Carl Lineberger (born 1939), American chemist